Makrauli is the first village on Rohtak-Gohana-Panipat highway in the Indian state of Haryana. The village is composed of two adjacent small villages, Makrauli Khurd (मकड़ौली खुर्द) and Makrauli Kalan (मकड़ौली कलां).

Demographics 
According to the 2011 census of India, Makrouli Khurd had a population of 2828 in 476 households. Males (1506) constitute 53.25% of the population and females (1322) 46.74%. Makrouli Khurd has an average literacy (2076) rate of 73.4%, more than the national average of 73.4%: male literacy (1183) is 56.98%, and female literacy (893) is 43.01% of total literates (2076). In Makrouli Khurd, 11.88% of the population is under 6 years of age (336).

Mudgil, of Brahmin caste, are the main inhabitants. Some Jat people of Punia Gotra reside in the village.

Arya Samaj Gurukul is on ladhot road.

Education 
A Government Senior Secondary School (GSSS) is near the village pond.

Culture 
The village has a temple, small mandi and housing projects.

Economy 
Axis Bank has a branch there.

Transport 
The village is near Rohtak-Gohana toll road. It is 220 km away from Chandigarh, 56 km from Delhi and 5 km from Rohtak.

References 

Villages in Rohtak district